Prunus wallaceana is a species of Prunus native to Sulawesi, the Maluku Islands and the Lesser Sunda Islands. It is a tree reaching 30m. It goes by a number of common names, some of them shared with other species, including kenda, lepi and hedhé.

References

wallaceana
Flora of the Lesser Sunda Islands
Flora of the Maluku Islands
Flora of Sulawesi
Plants described in 1965